The discography of American comedy music troupe The Lonely Island consists of three studio albums, two soundtrack albums, twenty-four singles and thirty-six music videos. Group members Andy Samberg, Akiva Schaffer and Jorma Taccone began creating live skits, comedy shorts and music parodies together in the early 2000s, having met the previous decade, during their high school years. The Lonely Island later caught the attention of television producer Lorne Michaels, who was impressed by their material. Michaels subsequently hired Samberg, Schaffer and Taccone as cast members and writers for his live sketch comedy show Saturday Night Live. Two musical shorts created by the group for the show, "Lazy Sunday" and "Dick in a Box", gained popularity on the Internet and garnered much media attention.

The Lonely Island's 2008 single "Jizz in My Pants" later became the group's first entry on the United States Billboard Hot 100 record chart, where it peaked at number 72. Incredibad, their debut studio album, was released on February 10, 2009, and peaked at number 13 on the Billboard 200. It topped the Billboard Top Comedy Albums chart and has sold 358,000 copies in the United States. "I'm on a Boat", the album's third single, peaked at number 56 on the Billboard Hot 100 and was nominated for Best Rap/Sung Collaboration at the 2010 Grammy Awards. The single was later certified two times platinum by the Recording Industry Association of America (RIAA).

The Lonely Island released their second studio album Turtleneck & Chain on May 10, 2011. The album peaked at number three on the Billboard 200 and became the year's top-selling comedy album in the United States. "I Just Had Sex", the album's first single, peaked at number 30 on the Billboard Hot 100 and received a platinum certification from the RIAA. Three singles from Turtleneck & Chain – "I Just Had Sex", "Jack Sparrow" and "The Creep" – rank among the five highest-selling tracks in the history of the Billboard comedy singles chart. The Wack Album, the group's third studio album, was released on June 11, 2013. It debuted at its peak position of number ten on the Billboard 200, with first-week sales of 28,000 copies. "YOLO" was the most successful of the album's eight singles, peaking at number 60 on the Billboard Hot 100. In 2016, the group wrote, directed, and starred in the mockumentary comedy film Popstar: Never Stop Never Stopping, and also recorded its accompanying soundtrack album, which peaked at number 69 on the Billboard 200.

Albums

Studio albums

Soundtrack albums

Singles

Other charted songs

Music videos

Notes

References

External links
 Official website
 The Lonely Island at AllMusic
 
 

Discography
Comedian discographies
Discographies of American artists